Linodendron is a genus of flowering plants belonging to the family Thymelaeaceae.

Its native range is Cuba.

Species:

Linodendron aronifolium 
Linodendron cubanum 
Linodendron venosum

References

Thymelaeaceae
Malvales genera